The Columbia Mules were a Minor League Baseball team that played in the Class D Alabama–Tennessee League in 1921. They were located in Columbia, Tennessee, and were named in reference to Columbia being known as the "Mule Capital of the World" and holding "Mule Day" celebrations since 1840. Their home games were played at Pillow Park

Columbia was previously represented by an unnamed team in the Tennessee–Alabama League from 1903 to 1904. The Mules lost their season opener against the Tri-Cities Triplets, 4–2, on May 16, 1921. They ended the season with a 42–46 (.477) record, placing third out of four teams. They did not qualify for the championship playoffs as they did not win either half of the league' split season.

The city did not field another team until a different Columbia Mules played in the Big South League in 1996.

Season results

References

External links
Statistics from Baseball-Reference
Statistics from Stats Crew

1921 establishments in Tennessee
1921 disestablishments in Tennessee
Baseball teams established in 1921
Baseball teams disestablished in 1921
Defunct Alabama-Tennessee League teams
Defunct baseball teams in Tennessee
Professional baseball teams in Tennessee
Sports in Tennessee